Sumar may refer to:
 Sumar, Iran, a city in Iran
 Sumar District, an administrative subdivision of Iran
 Sumar Rural District, an administrative subdivision of Iran
 Sumar, Netherlands, a village in the northern Netherlands
 Sumar (electoral platform)
 Soumar (missile), Another spelling of Sumar. an Iranian long-range cruise missile